Self-ownership, also known as sovereignty of the individual or individual sovereignty, is the concept of property in one's own person, expressed as the moral or natural right of a person to have bodily integrity and be the exclusive controller of one's own body and life. Self-ownership is a central idea in several political philosophies that emphasize individualism, such as libertarianism, liberalism, and anarchism.

Definitional issues

The self 
American libertarian socialist Stephen Pearl Andrews frequently discussed the sovereignty of the individual in his writings. In The Science of Society, he says that protestantism, democracy and socialism are "three partial announcements of one generic principle" which is "the sovereignty of the individual". Andrews considered the sovereignty of the individual to be "the basis of harmonious intercourse amongst equals, precisely as the equal Sovereignty of States is the basis of harmonious intercourse between nations mutually recognizing their independence of each other."

Discussion of the boundary of self with respect to ownership and responsibility has been explored by legal scholar Meir Dan-Cohen in his essays on The Value of Ownership and Responsibility and the Boundaries of the Self. The emphasis of this work illuminates the phenomenology of ownership and our common usage of personal pronouns to apply to both body and property—this serves as the folk basis for legal conceptions and debates about responsibility and ownership. Another view holds that labor is alienable because it can be contracted out, thus alienating it from the self. In this view, the choice of a person to voluntarily sell oneself into slavery is also preserved by the principle of self-ownership.

Labour markets and private property 
For anarcho-communist political philosopher L. Susan Brown: "Liberalism and anarchism are two political philosophies that are fundamentally concerned with individual freedom yet differ from one another in very distinct ways. Anarchism shares with liberalism a commitment to individual freedom while rejecting liberalism's competitive property relations". Scholar Ellen Meiksins Wood says that "there are doctrines of individualism that are opposed to Lockean individualism... and non-Lockean individualism may encompass socialism".

Right-libertarian conceptions of self-ownership extend the concept to include control of private property as part of the self. According to Gerald Cohen, "the libertarian principle of self-ownership says that each person enjoys, over herself and her powers, full and exclusive rights of control and use, and therefore owes no service or product to anyone else that she has not contracted to supply".

Philosopher Ian Shapiro says that labor markets affirm self-ownership because if self-ownership were not recognized, then people would not be allowed to sell the use of their productive capacities to others. He says that the individual sells the use of his productive capacity for a limited time and conditions but continues to own what he earns from selling the use of that capacity and the capacity itself, thereby retaining sovereignty over himself while contributing to economic efficiency. A common view within classical liberalism is that sovereign-minded individuals usually assert a right of private property external to the body, reasoning that if a person owns themselves, they own their actions, including those that create or improve resources, therefore they own their own labour and the fruits thereof.

In Human Action, Austrian School economist Ludwig von Mises argues that labor markets are the rational conclusion of self-ownership and argues that collective ownership of labor ignores differing values for the labor of individuals:

Other scholars are critical of the idea of private property, specifically within anarchism. The anarchist Oscar Wilde said:

Within anarchism, the concept of wage slavery refers to a situation perceived as quasi-voluntary slavery, where a person's livelihood depends on wages, especially when the dependence is total and immediate. It is a negatively connoted term used to draw an analogy between slavery and wage labor by focusing on similarities between owning and renting a person. The term "wage slavery" has been used to criticize economic exploitation and social stratification, with the former seen primarily as unequal bargaining power between labor and capital (particularly when workers are paid comparatively low wages, e.g. in sweatshops) and the latter as a lack of workers' self-management, fulfilling job choices and leisure in an economy. With the advent of the Industrial Revolution, thinkers such as Pierre-Joseph Proudhon and Karl Marx elaborated the comparison between wage labor and slavery in the context of a critique of societal property not intended for active personal use while Luddites emphasized the dehumanization brought about by machines. Emma Goldman famously denounced "wage slavery" by saying: "The only difference is that you are hired slaves instead of block slaves".

Within left-libertarianism, scholars such as Hillel Steiner, Peter Vallentyne, Philippe Van Parijs, Michael Otsuka and David Ellerman root an economic egalitarianism in the classical liberal concepts of self-ownership and land appropriation, combined with geoist or physiocratic views regarding the ownership of land and natural resources (e.g. those of John Locke and Henry George). Left-libertarians "maintain that the world's natural resources were initially unowned or belonged equally to all, and it is illegitimate for anyone to claim exclusive private ownership of these resources to the detriment of others. Such private appropriation is legitimate only if everyone can appropriate an equal amount, or if those who appropriate more are taxed to compensate those who are thereby excluded from what was once common property". This position is articulated in contrast to the position of other libertarians who argue for a right to appropriate parts of the external world based on sufficient use, even if this homesteading yields unequal results. Some left-libertarians of the Steiner–Vallentyne type support some form of income redistribution on the grounds of a claim by each individual to be entitled to an equal share of natural resources.

History 
John Locke wrote in his Two Treatises on Government that "every man has a Property in his own Person". Libertarian philosopher Robert Nozick interprets Locke as saying that the individual "has a right to decide what would become of himself and what he would do, and as having a right to reap the benefits of what he did". Josiah Warren was the first who wrote about the "sovereignty of the individual".

See also 

 Castle doctrine
 Civil libertarianism
 Civil liberties
 Cognitive liberty
 Counter-economics
 Empowerment
 Free will
 Freedom of speech
 Freedom of thought
 Harm principle
 Individualist anarchism
 Law of equal liberty
 Negative liberty
 Mind–body dualism
 Non-aggression principle
 Perpetual traveler
 Public-order crime
 Redemption movement
 Right to die
 Self-determination
 Sovereign citizen movement
 Sumptuary law
 Victimless crime

Notes and references

Bibliography

External links 
 Self-Ownership
 The Ego and Its Own  (also translated as The Individual and His Property, the main work by German philosopher Max Stirner)
 The Philosophy of Liberty
 What is a sovereign individual?

Abolitionism
Anarcho-capitalism
Classical liberalism
Libertarian theory
Economic ideologies
Autonomy
Sovereignty